The Grand Prix of Atlanta is a sports car race held at Road Atlanta in Braselton, Georgia.  The first running was held in 1973, as part of the IMSA GT Championship.  The race was held annually from 1973 until 1999, with separate spring and fall races held from 1976–1982.  With the rise of the Petit Le Mans as Road Atlanta's marquee sports car event, the Grand Prix was held only sporadically in the American Le Mans Series era.

In 1993 only, the event was held on the combined road course at Atlanta Motor Speedway as Road Atlanta was going through a bankruptcy and sale.

In 2020 due to New York state restrictions for crowds because of COVID-19, the 6 Hours of Watkins Glen was moved to Road Atlanta.

Winners

See also
Road Atlanta Can-Am
Petit Le Mans

References

External links
World Sports Racing Prototypes IMSA archive
Racing Sports Cars Road Atlanta archive
Ultimate Racing History Road Atlanta archive

 
Recurring sporting events established in 1973